Miroslav Yuryevich Romaschenko (born 16 December 1973) is a Belarusian professional football coach and a former player. He is an assistant coach of Hungarian club Ferencváros.

Playing career
He made his debut in the Russian Premier League in 1994 for FC Uralmash Yekaterinburg. He sustained career-ending injury playing for national team in UEFA Euro 2000 qualifying match against Denmark in September 1998. He never fully recovered from the injury and retired in 1999.

Coaching career
As a coach, Romaschenko worked closely with Stanislav Cherchesov, following him as an assistant coach at Zhemchuzhina-Sochi, Terek Grozny, Amkar Perm, Dynamo Moscow, Legia Warsaw, Russia national team and Ferencváros.

Personal life
His brother Maksim Romaschenko and his son Nikita Romaschenko were both professional footballers as well.

International goal

Honours
 Russian Premier League champion: 1997, 1998
 Russian Cup winner: 1998

European club competitions
 UEFA Intertoto Cup 1996 with FC Uralmash Yekaterinburg: 4 games
 UEFA Cup 1997–98 with FC Spartak Moscow: 9 games, 1 goal, semi-final reached
 UEFA Champions League 1998–99 with FC Spartak Moscow: 2 games

References

1973 births
Living people
People from Pavlohrad
Belarusian people of Ukrainian descent
Soviet footballers
Belarusian footballers
Belarusian expatriate footballers
Expatriate footballers in Russia
Belarusian expatriate sportspeople in Russia
Belarus international footballers
FC Shakhtar Pavlohrad players
FC Dnipro players
FC Rechitsa-2014 players
FC Dnepr Mogilev players
FC Ural Yekaterinburg players
FC Spartak Moscow players
Russian Premier League players
Belarusian football managers
Belarusian expatriate football managers
Expatriate football managers in Russia
Expatriate football managers in Poland
Belarusian expatriate sportspeople in Poland
Expatriate football managers in Hungary
Belarusian expatriate sportspeople in Hungary
FC Tom Tomsk managers
Belarusian Premier League players
Russian Premier League managers
Association football midfielders
FC Spartak-2 Moscow players